Sellur or Sellur, Madurai is a Neighborhood in Madurai district in the Indian State of Tamil Nadu.

Location 
Sellur is located at the coordinates of 9°56'03.3"N78°07'05.6"E.

Transport

Road transport 
Important roads such as Mahaan Gandhi road (60 feet road), Ahimsapuram 1st Street to 8th Street,

Library 
The public library in Sellur is with a collection of more than 35,000 books. This branch library was shifted to Suyarajyapuram First Main Road in the year 1998.

Worshipping

Temples 
Tiru Aappudayar temple located in Sellur is a Shiva temple of historical importance. It is praised in the hymns of Saint Tirugnana Sambandar. This is the second temple of Lord Shiva in Pandya region praised in Thevaram hymns.

Business 
Sellur was flooded with a lot of Handloom and Powerloom factories, that provided labour opportunities for more people. Buildings that housed handloom units are now book binding units, confectioneries and workshops. From around 10,000 looms and 12,000 workers in the beginning of this century, the handloom industry in Sellur now employees around 1,000 workers.

Political notability 
Sellur K. Raju who was elected from Madurai West Assembly constituency and was then Tamil Nadu minister, said that the DMK government had not announced or commenced any work for Madurai except for the construction of Kalaignar Memorial Library, coming up on New Natham Road.

Near Sellur, at the intersection of roads in Goripalayam, a standing posture statue of freedom-fighter-cum-sipiritual leader 'Paumpon Muthuramalingam Thevar' who was a significant figure in the 20th-century politics of Tamil Nadu, is erected. Sellur comes under Madurai West Assembly constituency and Madurai Lok Sabha constituency.

References 

Neighbourhoods and suburbs of Madurai